Dalaca variabilis is a species of moth of the family Hepialidae. It is known from Chile.

References

External links
Hepialidae genera

Moths described in 1950
Hepialidae
Moths of South America
Endemic fauna of Chile